Flávio Emídio dos Santos Vieira (born December 17, 1970 in Maceió) is a Brazilian goalkeeper who plays for Centro Sportivo Alagoano.

Honours

CSA

Campeonato Alagoano: 1991, 1994

Atlético Paranaense

Campeonato Brasileiro Série B: 1995
Campeonato Paranaense: 1998, 2000, 2001, 2002 (Super Championship)
Campeonato Brasileiro Série A: 2001

Vasco da Gama

Campeonato Carioca: 2003

Paraná

Campeonato Paranaense: 2006

América Mineiro

Campeonato Mineiro Module II: 2008
Campeonato Brasileiro Série C: 2009

References

External links
Futpédia

1970 births
Living people
Brazilian footballers
Association football goalkeepers
Centro Sportivo Alagoano players
Club Athletico Paranaense players
CR Vasco da Gama players
Paraná Clube players
América Futebol Clube (MG) players
People from Maceió
Sportspeople from Alagoas